Sumit Rathi (born 26 August 2001), is an Indian professional footballer who plays as a defender for Indian Super League club ATK Mohun Bagan and the Indian national under-23 team.

Career

Early career
He started his career at AIFF Elite Academy, later joining Indian Arrows who play in the I-League for the 2017–18 season.

ATK
He was signed by ATK Reserves team for 2018-19 season, where he turned out for 10 matches in the season.

For the 2019–20 season, Rathi was called up to the senior team by manager Antonio Lopez Habas. He was declared 'Hero of the Match' in the match against Mumbai City in the 11th round of the season. After making 14 appearances in his breakthrough season and impressing throughout, as well as helping ATK to their 3rd ISL trophy, he was declared the Emerging Player of the Season for 2019–20.

2020–2021 season
On 14 August Sumit Rathi signed a five-year contract for ATK Mohun Bagan keeping him till 2025.

Career statistics

Club

Honours

Club

ATK
 Indian Super League: 2019-20

National Team

India U19
OFC Youth Development Tournament: 2019

Individual
 ISL Emerging Player of the League: 2019-20

References

External links 

Indian Super League players
ATK (football club) players
2001 births
Living people
Indian footballers
India youth international footballers
Association football defenders
ATK Mohun Bagan FC players
Indian Arrows players
People from Muzaffarnagar district
Footballers from Uttar Pradesh